London Horror Comic is a British horror comic book anthology. The book is written and published by John-Paul Kamath who founded London Horror Comic Ltd. The London Horror Comic was featured on BBC Radio 4 as part of a documentary about The Gorbals Vampire  and interviewed about the history of horror comics.

Publication history
London Horror Comic began as a monthly webcomic in 2006 featuring a series of black and white silent comic strips. These were drawn by artists Cretien Hughes and Lee Ferguson and written by John-Paul Kamath. Prior to starting London Horror Comic, Kamath had been a writer on the US horror title Trailer Park of Terror for six years  by Imperium Comics. The comic was later turned into a feature film of the same name.

In August 2006, the London Horror Comic published its first full colour print story as an original comic strip called "Intermission" as a part of the programme guide to the Zone Horror Frightfest Film Festival 2006.

In 2008, London Horror Comic Ltd published the first in a series of full colour print issues with the release of London Horror Comic #1. Kamath said some of his main influences behind London Horror Comic were comics like Creepy and Eerie much more so than Tales from the Crypt.

London Horror Comic #1 was written by John-Paul Kamath and illustrated by Lee Ferguson (pencils), Marc Deering (inks), Matty Ryan (lettering and design) and Hi-Fi Design (colours) who would become the book's regular team.

Reception
London Horror Comic #1 drew praise for its mix of horror and humour. "Laugh out loud funny, like a horror Curb Your Enthusiasm. Kamath shows serious talent," said SFX magazine #165.

London Horror Comic #2 was published in April 2009 and continued to garner praise. The Girls Entertainment Network said issue had "...dialogue lines you’ll be quoting for days, ironic and cliche-breaking twists that make each story a page-turner, and a perfect balance of humor to top it all off." An advance review by Zone Horror Television in the UK said "London Horror Comic Issue 2 is surely one of the finest anthology collections around."

London Horror Comic #3 was printed and made available to buy on-line only from the London Horror Comic website as a 40-page extended issue. Garth Ennis said "Good stuff here from major new talent John-Paul Kamath – far too good, in fact, Enjoy London Horror Comic while you can, because I’m going to have him killed."

Notes

References

External links 

 

British comics titles
Horror comics